Zhang Jie may refer to:

Zhang Jie (writer) (1937–2022), Chinese novelist
Zhang Jie (scientist) (born 1958), Chinese physicist and former President of Shanghai Jiao Tong University 
Jason Zhang (born 1982), Chinese singer
Zhang Jie (voice actor) (born 1978), Chinese dub
Chase Chang (born 1982), Taiwanese musician and former member of Nan Quan Mama

Sportspeople
Zhang Jie (table tennis) (born 1965), Chinese para table tennis player
Zhang Jie (fencer) (born 1978), Chinese fencer
Zhang Jie (weightlifter) (born 1987), Chinese weightlifter
Zhang Jie (judoka) (born 1987), Chinese judoka